Yoo Young-jae (born January 24, 1994), also known mononymously as Youngjae, is a South Korean singer and actor. He debuted as an idol in the six-member group B.A.P under TS Entertainment, where he served as the main vocalist from 2012 to its dissolution in 2019. He released his debut mini-album Fancy in April 2019.

Early life
Yoo was born on January 24, 1994, in Bangbae-dong in the Seocho District of Seoul. He is the second and younger son of his father and fashion brand business-owning mother. He lived in a wealthy household up until the 1997 Asian financial crisis; his family struggled financially thereafter. They lived in a container home for a period of time and his father moved away. Yoo lived in a villa in Yongin with his mother and they moved into a basement room in Seoul. He spent his youth playing video games and, in sixth grade, wanted to become a pro-gamer. In his second year of middle school, Yoo sang during a talent show with a group of friends; he described the cheers for an encore "only for me". The following year, he enrolled in a music hagwon where he began receiving music lessons.

Career

2012-2019: Career beginnings and B.A.P

Yoo auditioned at several music agencies as a high school student. After spending tens months in communication, he became a trainee under JYP Entertainment and was slated to debut in a group at the time. He ultimately left the record company one year later citing "personal reasons". He auditioned for TS Entertainment and was signed to the label soon after.

Yoo was revealed as a member of idol sextet B.A.P on January 18, 2012, where he served as the main vocalist. The group debuted eight days later with its single album Warrior. In November 2014, the group filed a lawsuit against its agency. The members sought to nullify its contract with the company citing "unfair conditions and profit distribution". In August of the following year, the two parties ultimately settled and B.A.P resumed its activities under TS Entertainment. In August and December 2018, Yongguk and Zelo left the group and record label following the expiration of their contracts, respectively. Yoo and the remaining three members left the agency in February 2019, leading to the dissolution of B.A.P.

2019-present: Solo activities
Yoo established an independent record label to release his solo music. He released his debut mini-album Fancy on April 19. Yoo was cast as the lead role in JTBC's app drama series Kim Seul Gi Genius as the lead character. The app was released on iOS and Android and the first episode was made available to watch on May 18, 2019. It will be made available for streaming in November 2019. Yoo also joined the cast of TvN D's variety, 'Mileage Soccer' where celebrities played soccer with various soccer teams in Korea to raise money for charity.

On August 29, 2019, it was announced that Yoo had signed an exclusive contract with a new agency, DMost Entertainment. Under DMost Entertainment, Yoo would continue to pursue music as well as acting and variety. Yoo was cast in his first major television role in the KBS drama Woman of 9.9 Billion which began airing in November. Yoo also participated in his first OST for the drama. The song, "그녀가 처음 울던날" is a remake of Kim Kwang Seok's song of the same name.

Yoo made his comeback with his second mini-album O,on on October 22.

In March 2020, fans speculated that Yoo had terminated his contract with DMost Entertainment after his profile had been taken down from the company's official website. After fans contacted the company, it was confirmed that he had terminated his contract with them. Yoo was then represented again by his one-man agency, JWorld Entertainment.

In June 2020, it was revealed that Yoo had been cast in tvN's historical comedy drama, Mr. Queen through an official audition process. The drama was first aired on December 12, 2020.

In February 2021, it was announced that Yoo would be making his debut on the big screen with Sing a Song, where he would be playing the lead character Hyun-do, a teenager from an elite family who wants to pursue pop music rather than classical music.

On March 14, 2022, it was revealed that Yoo signed a contract with Forstar Company, who would support him in his acting career. 

Yoo has since continued developing his acting career, appearing in various dramas such as Police University, as Jo Joon-wook, and Mimicus as Han You-sung.

Personal life

Military service 
On November 6, 2022, Yoo posted on Instagram that he would be serving his mandatory military service on November 8, 2022.

Discography

Extended plays

Singles

As lead artist

Other releases

Filmography

Film

Television series

Web series

Television shows

Notes

References

External links
 
 
 

1994 births
21st-century South Korean male actors
21st-century South Korean singers
B.A.P (South Korean band) members
Japanese-language singers of South Korea
K-pop singers
Living people
Male actors from Seoul
Singers from Seoul
South Korean male idols
South Korean male singers
South Korean male television actors
TS Entertainment artists